RK Petrovice is a Czech rugby club in Petrovice, Prague. They currently play in the 2nd League of the Czech Republic.

History
The club was founded in 1944. After having played in Troja, Stodůlky, Lhotka and Nebušice, they started playing in Petrovice in 1980, which came about after club member Otto Kodera discovered a disused football field.

Historical names
 Radostně vpřed a HC Blesk (1944)
 I. ČLTK (1945–49)
 Sokol Praha 1 (1950)
 TJ Motorlet Praha (1950–91)
 RK Petrovice (1992-)

External links
 RK Petrovice
 80 years of Czech Rugby

Czech rugby union teams
Sport in Prague
Rugby clubs established in 1944